At least two ships of the French Navy have been named Fier :
 
  launched in 1694 and broken up in 1715
  launched in 1745 and sold in 1782

French Navy ship names